The 2012 Rhode Island Rams football team represented the University of Rhode Island in the 2012 NCAA Division I FCS football season. They were led by fourth year head coach Joe Trainer and played their home games at Meade Stadium. They were a member of the Colonial Athletic Association. They finished the season 0–11, 0–8 in CAA play to finish in last place.

By finishing the season with zero wins, the Rams lost a school-record 13 straight contests dating back to the final two games of the 2011 season. It is also their first winless season since 1949 when they went 0–8.

Schedule

References

Rhode Island
Rhode Island Rams football seasons
College football winless seasons
Rhode Island Rams football